Lindsey Fawcett is a retired British actress. She is perhaps best known for her role as the inmate Sharon 'Shaz' Wylie on the hit drama television series, Bad Girls.

Biography
Lindsey's first professional job was playing Bet in Sam Mendes’ production of Oliver! at the London Palladium. She went on to perform in numerous theatre productions including The Prime of Miss Jean Brodie, directed by Phyllida Lloyd for The National Theatre and A Small Family Business at Chichester. She toured with the RSC in Coriolanus and The Merry Wives of Windsor and has performed in several radio plays including Agatha Christie's Evil Under The Sun for BBC Radio 4.

Personal life
Fawcett lives with her partner and children in Sheffield.

Lindsey went to Ackworth School where she had a music scholarship and the University of Sheffield from 2005 to 2008 studying French and journalism. She achieved a first class honours degree.

Lindsey has run several marathons and has raised money for the charity St Luke's Hospice.

Her younger sister, Keeley, starred as Charlotte Braithwaite on At Home with the Braithwaites.

Filmography

References

External links

Living people
English television actresses
1979 births
Actresses from Liverpool